Phaonia is a very large genus from the fly family Muscidae. It is distributed worldwide, with more than 750 species having been described.

Species list

P. abditus (Giglio-Tos, 1893)
P. aberrans Malloch, 1919
P. acerba Stein, 1918
P. acronocera Feng, 2002
P. acrostichalis Emden, 1965
P. adriani Zinovjev, 1994
P. advena Snyder, 1957
P. aethiopica Curran, 1938
P. aizuensis Shinonaga, 2003
P. alatavica Zinovjev, 1983
P. albocalyptrata Malloch, 1920
P. algida Zinovjev, 1983
P. alpicola Zetterstedt, 1845
P. alticiella Zinovjev, 1990
P. alticola Malloch, 1923
P. amabilis Meigen, 1826
P. amamiensis Shinonaga & Kano, 1971
P. amica Ma & Deng, 2002
P. amicula Villeneuve, 1922
P. ampycocerca Xue & Yang, 1998
P. amurensis Hennig, 1963
P. angelicae (Scopoli, 1763)
P. angustifrons Shinonaga & Kano, 1971
P. angustinudiseta Xue, 1998
P. angustipalpata Xue, 1998
P. angustiprosternum Ma, 1992
P. anshuensis Wu, Li, Dong & Wei, 2016
P. antennalis Huckett, 1966
P. antenniangusta Xue, Chen & Cui, 1997
P. antennicrassa Xue, 1988
P. apicalis Stein, 1914
P. apicaloides Ma & Cui, 1992
P. apicata Johannsen, 1916
P. apicefemorata Emden, 1965
P. arcuaticauda Chen & Xue, 1997
P. argentifrons Xue, Chen & Liang, 1993
P. arida Zinovjev, 1983
P. asiatica Hennig, 1963
P. asierrans Zinovjev, 1981
P. atkinsoni Emden, 1965
P. atlanis Malloch, 1923
P. atriceps (Loew, 1858)
P. atrochaeta Zinovjev, 1980
P. atrocitrea Malloch, 1923
P. atrocyanea Ringdahl, 1916
P. atronitens Malloch, 1921
P. aurata Zinovjev, 1992
P. aurea Malloch, 1923
P. aureipollinosa Xue & Wang, 1986
P. aureola Shinonaga & Kano, 1971
P. aureolicauda Ma & Wu, 1989
P. aureolimaculata Wu, 1988
P. aureolitarsis Xue & Xiang, 1993
P. aureoloides Hsue, 1984
P. auricoxa Emden, 1965
P. axinoides Feng, 1995
P. ayubiensis Shinonaga, 2007
P. azaleella Feng, 2002
P. azygos Malloch, 1923
P. babarabica Sorokina, 2015
P. bacillirostris Xue & Wang, 2009
P. bambusa Shinonaga & Kano, 1971
P. bambusella Zinovjev, 1992
P. bambusoida Ma, 2002
P. baolini Feng, 2000
P. baoxingensis Feng & Ma, 2002
P. barkama Xue, 1998
P. basichaeta Emden, 1965
P. basiseta Malloch, 1920
P. basisetosa Zinovjev, 1992
P. beizhenensis Mou, 1986
P. bella Carvalho, 1983
P. benxiensis Xue & Yu, 1986
P. berolinensis Hennig, 1963
P. biauriculata Feng, 1998
P. bicolorantis Xue, Wang & Du, 2006
P. bidentata Ringdahl, 1933
P. biseta Stein, 1913
P. bitincta Rondani, 1866
P. bitrigona Xue, 1984
P. blaesomera Feng, 2002
P. boliviana Coelho, 1998
P. brendana Pont, 1976
P. brevipalpata Fang & Fan, 1988
P. breviplumosa Emden, 1965
P. brevispina Malloch, 1923
P. bruneiaurea Xue & Feng, 1986
P. brunneiabdomina Xue & Cao, 1989
P. brunneipalpis Mou, 1986
P. brunneivittis Emden, 1943
P. bulanga Xue, 1998
P. bulbiclavula Xue & Li, 2001
P. bumbusoides Ma, 1998
P. bysia Walker, 1849
P. caeruleicolor Stein, 1910
P. caerulescens Stein, 1898
P. calceicerca Xue, 1998
P. californiensis Malloch, 1923
P. canaliculata Robineau-Desvoidy, 1830
P. canariensis Villeneuve, 1936
P. canescens Stein, 1916
P. carvalhoi Coelho, 1998
P. caudilata Fang & Fan, 1993
P. cauta Huckett, 1973
P. centa Feng & Ma, 2002
P. cercoechinata Fang & Fan, 1986
P. cercoechinatoida Feng & Ma, 2002
P. chalchica Zinovjev, 1980
P. chalcica Zinovjev, 1980
P. changaica Zinovjev, 1990
P. changbaishanensis Ma & Wang, 1992
P. chaoyangensis Zhang, Cui & Wang, 1993
P. chianshanensis Ma & Wang, 1980
P. chilitica Deng & Feng, 1998
P. chuanierrans Xue & Feng, 1986
P. chuanxiensis Feng & Ma, 2002
P. cilitibia Albuquerque, 1955
P. cilitibia Emden, 1965
P. cincta Zetterstedt, 1846
P. cineripollinosa Xue, Tong & Wang, 2008
P. clavitarsis Feng & Ma, 2002
P. colbrani Collin, 1953
P. comihumera Feng & Ma, 2002
P. consobrina Zetterstedt, 1838
P. coriatlanis Huckett, 1966
P. coriatlanis Huckett, 1966
P. cothurnoloba Xue & Feng, 1986
P. crassicauda Xue, Chen & Liang, 1993
P. crassipalpis Shinonaga & Kano, 1971
P. crata Sun, Wu, Li & Wei, 2015
P. crytoista Fang & Fan, 1993
P. cuprina Feng & Ma, 2002
P. curvicercalis Wei, 1990
P. curvinervis Malloch, 1923
P. curvipes Stein, 1920
P. curviseta Emden, 1965
P. curviseta Xue & Yu, 2017
P. cuthbertsoni Curran, 1938
P. cylosternita Xue, 1998
P. czernyi Hennig, 1963
P. dahurica Zinovjev, 1990
P. datongensis Xue & Wang, 1986
P. dawushaensis Xue & Liu, 1985
P. daxinganlinga Ma & Cui, 2002
P. daxiongi Feng, 2001
P. dayiensis Ma & Deng, 2002
P. debiliaureola Xue & Cui, 1996
P. debiliceps Xue, 1998
P. debilifemoralis Xue & Cui, 1996
P. debilis Stein, 1918
P. decussatoides Ma & Wu, 1989
P. deformicauda Xue & Li, 2001
P. deleta Stein, 1898
P. dianierrans Xue & Li, 1991
P. dianxiia Li & Xue, 2001
P. diruta Stein, 1898
P. discauda Wei, 1994
P. disjuncta Stein, 1916
P. dismagnicornis Xue & Cao, 1989
P. dissimilis Malloch, 1923
P. dorsolineata Shinonaga & Kano, 1971
P. dorsolineatoides Ma & Xue, 1992
P. dupliciseta Ma & Cui, 1992
P. duplicispina Deng & Ma, 2002
P. edwardsi Emden, 1943
P. electrica Pont & Carvalho, 1997
P. emaishanensis Xue, 1998
P. equatorialis Coelho, 1998
P. erlangshanensis Ma & Feng, 1998
P. errans Meigen, 1826
P. erronea Schnabl, 1887
P. exoleta Meigen, 1826
P. falleni Michelsen, 1977
P. falsifuscicoxa Fang & Fan, 1993
P. fangshanensis Wang, Xue & Wu, 1997
P. fani Ma, 1992
P. fanjingshana Xue, Chen & Cui, 1997
P. fausta Huckett, 1965
P. fengyani Xue, 2017
P. fergusoni Malloch, 1924
P. fimbripeda Yang, Xue & Li, 2002
P. fissa Xue, 1984
P. flaticerca Deng & Feng, 1998
P. flava Stein, 1920
P. flavibasis Malloch, 1919
P. flavicauda Cui, Zhang & Xue, 1998
P. flavicornis Stein, 1913
P. flavinota Emden, 1965
P. flavipes Feng & Ma, 2002
P. flavitibia Johannsen, 1916
P. flavivivida Xue & Cao, 1989
P. flavomaculata Malloch, 1921
P. fortis Feng & Ma, 2002
P. fraterna Malloch, 1923
P. freyana Emden, 1965
P. fugax Tiensuu, 1946
P. fulviscenticoxa Feng & Ma, 2002
P. fulviscentitarsis Feng & Ma, 2002
P. fusca Meade, 1897
P. fuscana Huckett, 1965
P. fuscata Fallén, 1825
P. fusciantenna Feng & Ma, 2002
P. fusciapicalis Feng & Ma, 2002
P. fusciaurea Xue & Feng, 1986
P. fuscibasicosta Ma & Deng, 2002
P. fuscicauda Malloch, 1918
P. fuscicoxa Emden, 1965
P. fuscipalpis Shinonaga & Kano, 1971
P. fuscisquama Wulp, 1896
P. fuscitibia Shinonaga & Kano, 1971
P. fuscitrochanter Ma & Deng, 2002
P. fuscula Xue & Zhang, 1996
P. ganshuensis Ma & Wu, 1992
P. gergetica Zinovjev, 1994
P. giacomeli Carvalho, 1981
P. gilgitensis Shinonaga, 2007
P. glauca Malloch, 1931
P. gobertii Mik, 1881
P. gracilis Stein, 1916
P. graciloides Ma & Wang, 1985
P. grunini Zinovjev, 1980
P. grunnicornis Xue, 1998
P. guangdongensis Xue & Liu, 1985
P. guizhouensis Wei, 1991
P. gulianensis Ma & Cui, 1992
P. guttiventris Emden, 1943
P. hainanensis Xue, Tong & Wang, 2008
P. halophila Zinovjev, 1990
P. halterata Stein, 1898
P. hamiloba Ma & Wang, 1992
P. hanyuanensis Feng & Ma, 2002
P. harti Malloch, 1923
P. hebeta Fang & Fan, 1986
P. hebetoida Ma & Deng, 2002
P. heilongjiangensis Ma & Cui, 1992
P. heilongshanensis Xue, Cui & Zhang, 1996
P. hejinga Xue, 1998
P. hellenia Lyneborg, 1965
P. helvitibia Feng, 2002
P. hennigi Lyneborg, 1970
P. heteromma Emden, 1965
P. himalaica Zinovjev, 1992
P. hirtifrons Karl, 1940
P. hirtiorbitalis Xue, Wang & Du, 2006
P. hirtitibia Feng & Ma, 1994
P. hohuanshanensis Shinonaga & Huang, 2007
P. hokkaidensis Shinonaga & Kano, 1971
P. holcocerca Feng & Ma, 2000
P. honshuensis Shinonaga, 2003
P. horii Shinonaga & Kano, 1971
P. houghii Stein, 1898
P. huanrenensis Xue, 1984
P. hucketti Coelho, 1998
P. hugonis Carvalho, 1991
P. humeralis Schnabl in Schnabl & Dziedzicki, 1911
P. hunyuanensis Ma & Feng, 1998
P. hunza Shinonaga, 2007
P. hybrida (Schnabl, 1888)
P. hydrocharis Shinonaga & Kano, 1971
P. hystricosternita Xue, 1991
P. illustradorsata Feng & Ma, 2002
P. imitatrix Malloch, 1919
P. imitenuiseta Xue & Zhang, 1996
P. impigerata Feng & Ma, 2002
P. impura Zinovjev, 1987
P. incana Wiedemann, 1817
P. inenarrabilis Huckett, 1965
P. insetitibia Fang & Fan, 1988
P. interfrontalis Emden, 1965
P. iozen Shinonaga & Kano, 1971
P. irkutensis Zinovjev, 1990
P. ishizuchiensis Shinonaga & Kano, 1971
P. japonica Shinonaga & Kano, 1971
P. jaroschewskii (Schnabl, 1888)
P. jiagedaqiensis Ma & Cui, 1992
P. jilinensis Ma & Wang, 1992
P. jinbeiensis Xue & Wang, 1989
P. jiulongensis Xue, Tong & Wang, 2008
P. jomdaensis Xue, 1998
P. juglans Sorokina, 2015
P. jugorum Stein, 1916
P. kaala Shinonaga, 1994
P. kagaensis Shinonaga, 2003
P. kagannensis Shinonaga, 2007
P. kambaitiana Emden, 1965
P. kamchatkensis Shinonaga & Zhang, 2000
P. kanoi Shinonaga & Huang, 2007
P. kashmirensis Malloch, 1921
P. kaszabi Zinovjev, 1990
P. katoi Shinonaga & Kano, 1971
P. khumbuensis Shinonaga, 1994
P. khunjerabensis Shinonaga, 2007
P. kirghizorum Malyanov, 1993
P. klinostoichas Xue, Tong & Wang, 2008
P. kobica Schnabl in Schnabl & Dziedzicki, 1911
P. kuankuoshuiensis Wei, 1990
P. kugleri Lyneborg, 1965
P. labidocerca Feng & Ma, 2002
P. labidosternita Sun & Feng, 2004
P. laeta Fallén, 1823
P. lalashanensis Shinonaga & Huang, 2007
P. lamellata Fang, Li & Deng, 1986
P. lamellicauda Xue & Feng, 2002
P. laminidenta Xue & Cui, 1997
P. latecostata Emden, 1965
P. laticornis Malloch, 1923
P. laticrassa Xue, Chen & Cui, 1997
P. latierrans Xue, 1998
P. latifrons Schnabl in Schnabl & Dziedzicki, 1911
P. latifrontalis Hennig, 1963
P. latilamella Feng & Ma, 2002
P. latimargina Fang & Fan, 1988
P. latipalpis Schnabl in Schnabl & Dziedzicki, 1911
P. latipullatoides Wang, 1998
P. latistriata Deng & Feng, 1998
P. leichopodosa Sun, Feng & Ma, 2001
P. leigongshana Wei & Yang, 2007
P. lentiginosa Snyder, 1957
P. lepelleyi Emden, 1943
P. leptocorax Li & Xue, 1998
P. liaoningensis Ma & Xue, 1998
P. liaoshiensis Zhang & Zhang, 1995
P. liliputa Zinovjev, 1990
P. limbinervis Stein, 1918
P. lithuanica Schnabl in Schnabl & Dziedzicki, 1911
P. liujiayui Xue & Du, 2020
P. liupanshanensis Ma, 2002
P. longicornis Stein, 1916
P. longifurca Xue, 1984
P. longipalpis Emden, 1965
P. longiplumosa Emden, 1965
P. longirostris Xue & Zhao, 1998
P. longiseta Feng & Ma, 2002
P. lucidula Fang & Fan, 1993
P. luculenta Fang & Fan, 1993
P. luculentimacula Xue, 2000
P. lugubris Meigen, 1826
P. lushuiensis Xue & Li, 2001
P. luteipes Emden, 1965
P. luteovittata Shinonaga & Kano, 1971
P. luteovittoida Feng & Ma, 2002
P. lutescens Zinovjev, 1990
P. macroomata Xue & Yang, 1998
P. macropygus Feng, 1998
P. macrostemma Emden, 1965
P. maculiaurea Xue & Wang, 1998
P. maculiaureata Wang & Xue, 1997
P. maculierrans Xue, Zhang & Chen, 1993
P. maculosa Stein, 1911
P. magna Wei, 1994
P. magnicornis Zetterstedt, 1845
P. magnipalpis Emden, 1965
P. mai Xue, 1998
P. major Carvalho, 1984
P. majuscula Emden, 1951
P. malaiseana Emden, 1965
P. malaisei Ringdahl, 1930
P. malayana Malloch, 1935
P. maowenensis Deng & Feng, 1998
P. marakandensis Hennig, 1963
P. margina Wei & Yang, 2007
P. marginata Stein, 1918
P. marylandica Malloch, 1923
P. mediterranea Hennig, 1963
P. megacerca Feng & Ma, 2002
P. megastigma Ma & Feng, 1998
P. megistogenysa Feng & Ma, 2002
P. meigeni Pont, 1986
P. mengi Feng & Ma, 2000
P. mengshanensis Feng, 1993
P. metallica Zielke, 1970
P. mexicana Carvalho, 1984
P. microthelis Fang, Fan & Feng, 1991
P. mimerrans Ma, 1989
P. mimoaureola Ma, Ge & Li, 1992
P. mimobitrigona Xue, 1988
P. mimocandicans Ma, 1991
P. mimoincana Feng & Ma, 1994
P. mimopalpata Ma & Cui, 1992
P. mimotenuiseta Ma & Wu, 1989
P. mimovivida Feng & Ma, 1994
P. minoricalcar Wei, 1994
P. minuscula Albuquerque, 1955
P. minuta Carvalho, 1984
P. minutimutina Xue, 1998
P. minutiungula Zhang & Xue, 1996
P. minutivillana Xue, Yang & Li, 2000
P. misellimaculata Feng & Ma, 2002
P. modesta Sorokina, 2015
P. mogii Shinonaga & Kurahashi, 2006
P. mongolica Zinovjev, 1980
P. monochaeta Snyder, 1957
P. montana Shinonaga & Kano, 1971
P. monticola Malloch, 1918
P. musashinensis Shinonaga, 2003
P. muscinoides Emden, 1943
P. mystica (Meigen, 1826)
P. mysticoides Ma & Wang, 1980
P. nakanishii Shinonaga, 1994
P. nana Shinonaga, 2003
P. nasiglobata Xue & Xiang, 1993
P. naticerca Xue, Chen & Liang, 1993
P. neglecta Huckett, 1966
P. nepenthincola Stein, 1909
P. nigeritegula Feng, 2002
P. nigerrima Carvalho, 1984
P. nigribasalis Xue, 1998
P. nigribasicosta Xue, 1998
P. nigribitrigona Yu & Xue, 2017
P. nigricans Johannsen, 1916
P. nigricauda Malloch, 1918
P. nigricorpus Shinonaga & Huang, 2007
P. nigricoxa Deng & Feng, 1998
P. nigrierrans Cui, Zhang & Xue, 1998
P. nigrifusca Xue, 1998
P. nigrifuscicoxa Xue, Wang & Du, 2006
P. nigrigenis Feng & Ma, 1994
P. nigriorbitalis Xue, 1998
P. nigripennis Ma & Cui, 1992
P. nigrirostrata Zinovjev, 1983
P. nigriserva Xue, 1998
P. nigrisquamma Stein, 1908
P. nigritenuiseta Xue & Zhang, 1996
P. nigrivillana Xue, Yang & Li, 2000
P. nigrocincta Stein, 1918
P. nigrogeniculata Shinonaga & Kano, 1971
P. ninae Sorokina, 2015
P. ningwuensis Wang & Xue, 1998
P. ningxiaensis Ma & Zhao, 1992
P. nitidula Zinovjev, 1992
P. nititerga Xue, 1988
P. nitiventris Xue & Zhang, 1996
P. niximountaina Xue & Yu, 2017
P. notofusca Zinovjev, 1983
P. nounechesa Wei & Yang, 2007
P. nuditarsis Xue & Wang, 2009
P. nymphaearum Robineau-Desvoidy, 1830
P. obscurinervis Stein, 1914
P. obsoleta Hennig, 1963
P. ocellaris Malloch, 1929
P. ommatina Zinovjev, 1981
P. oncocerca Feng & Ma, 2002
P. ontakensis Shinonaga, 2003
P. opalina Schnabl in Schnabl & Dziedzicki, 1911
P. orientalis Xue, Song & Chen, 2002
P. oxystoma Emden, 1965
P. oxystomodes Emden, 1965
P. paederocerca Feng & Ma, 2002
P. pallida Fabricius, 1787
P. pallidisquama Zetterstedt, 1849
P. pallidosa Huckett, 1965
P. pallidula Coquillett, 1902
P. palpata Stein, 1897
P. palpibrevis Xue, 1998
P. palpinormalis Feng & Ma, 2002
P. papillaria Fang & Fan, 1993
P. paradecussata Hennig, 1963
P. paradisia Li & Xue, 2001
P. paradisincola Xue, Zhang & Zhu, 2006
P. parahebata Ma & Deng, 2002
P. parallelifrons Emden, 1943
P. paramersicrassa Xue, 1998
P. pardiungula Xue & Li, 2001
P. parviceps Malloch, 1918
P. patersoni Zielke, 1971
P. pattalocerca Feng, 1998
P. paucispina Fang & Cui, 1988
P. pendleburyi Malloch, 1935
P. pennifuscata Fan, 1996
P. perdita Meigen, 1830
P. peregrina Malloch, 1921
P. peregrinans Huckett, 1965
P. perfida Stein, 1920
P. picealis Huckett, 1965
P. pilosipennis Xue, Zhang & Zhu, 2006
P. pilosiventris Feng, 1998
P. pingbaensis Wu, Dong & Wei, 2015
P. planeta Feng & Ma, 2002
P. platysurstylus Xue & Wang, 2009
P. plurivittata Couri, Pont & Penny, 2006
P. ponti Coelho, 1998
P. postifugax Xue, 1998
P. praefuscifemora Feng & Ma, 2002
P. pratensis Robineau-Desvoidy, 1830
P. prisca Stein, 1920
P. proocellata Emden, 1965
P. protrusa Shinonaga, 1994
P. protuberans Malloch, 1923
P. proxima Wulp, 1869
P. pseuderrans Hennig, 1963
P. pseudofuscata Shinonaga, 2003
P. pseudomystica Zinovjev, 1987
P. pterospila Stein, 1918
P. pudoa Hall, 1937
P. pullata Czerny, 1900
P. pullatoides Xue & Zhao, 1985
P. pulvillata Stein, 1904
P. punctinerva Xue, 1988
P. punctinervis Stein, 1911
P. punctipennis Shinonaga & Kano, 1971
P. punoensis Coelho, 1998
P. pusilla Zinovjev, 1990
P. qingheensis Xue, 1984
P. qinshuiensis Wang, Xue & Wu, 1997
P. quercus Coelho, 1998
P. quieta Stein, 1920
P. reclusa Huckett, 1966
P. recta Hsue, 1984
P. rectinervis Emden, 1965
P. rectoides Xue, 1998
P. redactata Feng, 1998
P. reflecta Huckett, 1966
P. reniformis Fang, Fan & Feng, 1991
P. reversa Huckett, 1966
P. rhodesi Malloch, 1929
P. ripara Liu & Xue, 1996
P. robusta Carvalho, 1984
P. rossica Lavciev, 1971
P. rubriventris Emden, 1965
P. rubriventris ssp. flaviventris Wei, 1991
P. rufibasis Malloch, 1919
P. rufihalter Ma & Cui, 1998
P. rufipalpis Macquart, 1835
P. rufiventris (Scopoli, 1763)
P. rufivulgaris Xue & Wang, 1989
P. rugia Walker, 1849
P. ryukyuensis Shinonaga & Kano, 1971
P. sagami Shinonaga & Kano, 1971
P. saltuosa Shinonaga & Kano, 1971
P. sasakii Shinonaga & Huang, 2007
P. savonoskii Malloch, 1923
P. scotti Emden, 1943
P. scrofigena Ma & Xue, 1998
P. scutellata Zetterstedt, 1845
P. semicarina Fan, 1996
P. semilunara Feng, 2000
P. semilunaroida Feng, 2002
P. septentrionalis Xue & Yu, 1986
P. seriesetosa Emden, 1965
P. serva Meigen, 1826
P. seticaudata Shinonaga & Kano, 1971
P. setisternita Ma & Deng, 2002
P. shaanxiensis Xue & Cao, 1989
P. shannoni Carvalho & Pont, 1993
P. shanxiensis Zhang, Zhao & Wu, 1985
P. shenyangensis Ma, 1998
P. shuierrans Feng, 1995
P. sibirica Pont, 1981
P. sichotensis Zinovjev, 1980
P. siebecki Schnabl in Schnabl & Dziedzicki, 1911
P. simulans Malloch, 1931
P. sinidecussata Xue & Xiang, 1993
P. sinierrans Xue & Cao, 1989
P. sobriana Huckett, 1966
P. soccata Walker, 1849
P. soratiensis Coelho, 1998
P. sordidisquama Stein & Becker, 1908
P. sparsicilium Xue & Wang, 2009
P. spinicauda Xue, 2000
P. splendida Hennig, 1963
P. splendida Carvalho, 1983
P. spuripilipes Fang & Fan, 1993
P. stackelbergi Hennig, 1963
P. stenoparafacia Fang & Fan, 1993
P. striata Stein, 1898
P. subalpicola Xue, 1998
P. subalpicoloida Ma & Deng, 2002
P. subapicalis Wei, 1991
P. subaureola Feng & Ma, 2002
P. subaureola Xue, Zhang & Chen, 1993
P. subcandicans Zinovjev, 1983
P. subconsobrina Ma, 1992
P. subdecussata Hennig, 1963
P. subeiensis Ma & Wu, 1992
P. subemarginata Fang, Li & Deng, 1986
P. suberrans Feng, 1989
P. subfausta Ma & Wu, 1989
P. subflavivida Feng & Ma, 2002
P. subfusca Malloch, 1923
P. subfuscibasicosta Feng & Ma, 2002
P. subfuscinervis Zetterstedt, 1838
P. subfuscitrochenter Ma & Deng, 2002
P. subhybrida Feng & Ma, 2002
P. sublatilamella Xue & Wang, 2009
P. submontana Ma, 1992
P. submystica Xue & Cao, 1989
P. submysticoida Ma & Wang, 2002
P. subnigra Shinonaga & Kano, 1971
P. subnigrisquama Xue & Li, 1989
P. subnigrisquama Xue & Zhao, 1992
P. subnudiseta Xue, 1998
P. subpalpata Fang, Li & Deng, 1986
P. subpilipes Xue & Yu, 2017
P. subpilosipennis Wu, Dong & Wei, 2015
P. subprofugax Xue, 1984
P. subpullata Wei, 1994
P. subpunctinerva Feng & Ma, 2002
P. subscutellata Xue, 1991
P. subsemilunara Feng, 2000
P. subtenuiseta Ma & Wu, 1989
P. subtrimaculata Feng & Ma, 2002
P. subtrisetiacerba Ma & Deng, 2002
P. subventa Harris, 1780
P. subvivida Ma & Cui, 1992
P. succini Pont & Carvalho, 1997
P. succintiantenna Feng & Ma, 2002
P. suecica Ringdahl, 1947
P. sumatrana Malloch, 1928
P. sunqiia Xue & Du, 2020
P. sunwuensis Xue & Ma, 1998
P. supernapica Feng & Ma, 2000
P. suscepta Xue, 1998
P. suturalis Stein, 1913
P. sytschevskajae Hennig, 1963
P. szelenyii Mihályi, 1974
P. taigensis Zinovjev, 1987
P. taiwanensis Shinonaga & Huang, 2007
P. taizipingga Feng, 2002
P. tenebriona Huckett, 1965
P. tenuilobatus Sun, Wu, Li & Wei, 2015
P. tersa Villeneuve, 1936
P. tetragona Gaminara, 1930
P. tettigona Feng & Ma, 2002
P. texensis Malloch, 1923
P. thomsoni Malloch, 1921
P. thudamensis Shinonaga, 1994
P. tianmushanensis Xue & Du, 2020
P. tianshanensis Xue, 1998
P. tianshanica Zinovjev, 1983
P. tiefii (Schnabl, 1888)
P. tinctiscutaris Xue, Zhang & Zhu, 2006
P. tipulivora Malloch, 1923
P. trimaculata Bouché, 1834
P. triseriata Emden, 1965
P. tristriolata Ma, 1992
P. trivialis Malloch, 1923
P. trypetiformis Shinonaga, 1998
P. tuberosurstyla Deng & Feng, 1998
P. tuguriorum Scopoli, 1763
P. umbrinervis Stein, 1910
P. uniseriata Malloch, 1923
P. unispina Xue, Chen & Liang, 1993
P. univittata Couri, Pont & Penny, 2006
P. ussuriensis Zinovjev, 1980
P. vagata Xue & Wang, 1985
P. vagatiorientalis Xue, 1998
P. valida (Harris, 1780)
P. varicolor Wei, 1990
P. varimacula Feng & Ma, 2002
P. venisetosa Emden, 1965
P. versicolor Stein, 1920
P. vichelseni Zinovjev, 1992
P. vietnamensis Shinonaga, 2000
P. villana Robineau-Desvoidy, 1830
P. villscutellata Xue, 2000
P. virgata Stein, 1913
P. vittihorax Stein, 1913
P. vividiformis Fang, Fan & Feng, 1991
P. vulgaris Shinonaga & Kano, 1971
P. wahlbergi Ringdahl, 1930
P. wanfodinga Feng & Ma, 2002
P. wangpingga Xue & Du, 2020
P. wenshuiensis Zhang, Zhao & Wu, 1985
P. whiteheadi Malloch, 1928
P. winnemanae Malloch, 1919
P. wulinga Xue, 1998
P. xanthofemina Shinonaga & Kano, 1971
P. xanthopleura Emden, 1965
P. xanthosoma Shinonaga & Huang, 2007
P. xianensis Xue & Cao, 1989
P. xiangningensis Ma & Wang, 1985
P. xihuaensis Sun & Feng, 2004
P. xingxianensis Ma & Wang, 1985
P. xishuensis Feng & Ma, 2002
P. xixianga Xue, 1998
P. xuei Wang & Xu, 1998
P. yaanensis Ma, Xue & Feng, 1998
P. yadongica Feng & Xu, 2008
P. yaeyamensis Shinonaga, 2003
P. yaluensis Ma, 1992
P. yanggaoensis Ma, 1992
P. yei Feng, 1995
P. yinggeensis Xue, 1991
P. yingjingensis Feng & Ma, 2002
P. youyuensis Xue & Wang, 1989
P. yuishanensis Shinonaga & Huang, 2007
P. yunapicalis Fang & Fan, 1998
P. zanclocerca Feng & Ma, 2002
P. zhangjunyui Xue & Du, 2020
P. zhangyeensis Ma & Wu, 1992
P. zhougongshana Ma & Feng, 2002
P. zinovjevi Malyanov, 1993
P. zugmayeriae (Schnabl, 1888)

References

Muscidae
Brachycera genera
Taxa named by Jean-Baptiste Robineau-Desvoidy